Old Natchez Trace refers to the historic Natchez Trace, a path from Mississippi to Tennessee.

Old Natchez Trace may also refer to:

Old Natchez Trace segments listed on the National Register of Historic Places